Vernonanthura polyanthes is a species of Neotropical plant in the tribe Vernonieae.

Description
It is a shrub or small tree, bearing white flowers in terminal heads during late winter (July to August). Its vertical bole and dull green, oblong-lanceolate leaves may remind of a Eucalyptus species.

Range and habitat
It is native to Brazil but was introduced to Sussundenga, Mozambique, in the early 1990s from where it quickly spread to Zimbabwe. In Africa it is a dominant invasive species, but it appears to compete best in disturbed areas along roadsides or along forest margins. It has invaded higher altitudes in lower densities.

Uses and agricultural impact
Its ample nectar supplies nourishment to bees in winter. For that reason it was introduced to Mozambique, but it also takes over fallow lands, where their eradication is labour-intensive.

References

polyanthes